Osmodes distincta, the distinct white-spots, is a butterfly in the family Hesperiidae. It is found in Guinea, Sierra Leone, Liberia, Ivory Coast, Ghana, Nigeria, Cameroon, Gabon, the Republic of the Congo, the Democratic Republic of the Congo, Uganda and north-western Tanzania. The habitat consists of wetter forests.

The larvae feed on Marantochloa species.

References

Butterflies described in 1896
Erionotini
Butterflies of Africa